The Somaliland passport is the passport issued to citizens of the unrecognized country of Somaliland for international travel. A passport was issued for the first time in 1996, and a biometric passport was in 2014, in line with new global standards and the requirements of the International Civil Aviation Organization.

Passport descriptions 
The color of the Somaliland passport is black, and it bears the symbol of the state’s sovereignty.  It also bears the following inscriptions in the Somali, Arabic and English languages:.

above:

"Republic of Somaliland"
()
()

In the center: 
there is the Emblem of Somaliland

Below: 
«Passport»

Acceptance for International  Travel 
Citizens with a Somaliland travel document can go to the following countries:

Types
There are a number of types of Somaliland passports:

 Regular Passport (black cover): issued to Somaliland citizens.
 Service Passport (green cover): issued to members of Parliament, members of the Government.
 Diplomatic Passport (red cover): issued to diplomats serving  abroad and to high-ranking officials from the executive branch and their families during their period of service.

Passport gallery

See also
Visa policy of Somaliland

References

External links

Somaliland
Government of Somaliland
Law of Somaliland